Haludbani is a census town in the Golmuri-cum-Jugsalai CD block in the Dhalbhum subdivision of the Purbi Singhbhum district in the Indian state of Jharkhand.

Geography

Location

Jamshedpur Urban Agglomeration 
With its recognition as an industrial town as early as the 1911 census, Jamshedpur was set on the road of steady population growth, as large number of emigrants flocked in for work opportunities. While in the earlier decades the central nucleus grew, in the later decades towns around Jamshedpur grew rapidly. In 2011, Jamshedpur Urban Agglomeration included 13 urban centres, with a total population of 1.3 million people. However, in more recent years, Jamshedpur UA “has lacked the growth and development observed around other similar industrial towns in western and southern India.” 

Note: The map alongside presents the Jamshedpur Urban Agglomeration. All places marked in the map are linked in the larger full screen map.

Demographics
According to the 2011 Census of India, Haludbani had a total population of 23,360, of which 12,949 (51%) were males and 12,411 (49%) were females. Population in the age range 0-6 years was 3,003. The total number of literate persons in Haludbani was 18,931 (84.68% of the population over 6 years).

(*For language details see Golmuri-cum-Jugsalai block#Language and religion)  

Jamshedpur Urban Agglomeration includes: Jamshedpur (Industrial Town), Jamshedpur (NAC), Tata Nagar Railway Colony (OG), Mango (NAC),  Jugsalai (M), Bagbera (CT), Chhota Gobindpur (CT), Haludbani (CT), Sarjamda (CT), Gadhra (CT), Ghorabandha (CT), Purihasa (CT), Adityapur (M Corp.), Chota Gamahria (CT) and Kapali (CT).

At the 2001 India census, Haludbani had a population of 19,933 (51% male, 49% female). Haludbani had an average literacy rate of 71%, higher than the national average of 59.5%. Male literacy was 78% and female literacy was 62%. 12% of the population were under 6 years of age.

Infrastructure 
Among the civic amenities, it had  of roads with open drains, the protected water supply involved hand pump, tube well/ borewell, overhead tank. It had 4,787 domestic electric connections, 10 road lighting points. Among the medical facilities, it had 5 hospitals, 5 dispensaries, 5 health centres, 7 family welfare centres, 12 maternity and child welfare centres, 12 maternity homes, 12 nursing homes, 6 veterinary hospitals, 2 medicine shops. It had 1 non-formal education centre (Sarva Shiksha Abhiyan). It produced sattu. It had the branch offices of 1 nationalised bank, 1 cooperative bank, 1 agricultural credit society.

References

Cities and towns in East Singhbhum district
Neighbourhoods in Jamshedpur